Bana Rural LLG is a local-level government (LLG) of the Autonomous Region of Bougainville, Papua New Guinea.

Wards
01. Baitsi
02. Lamane East
03. Lamane South
04. Telepi
05. Tomau
06. Velipe
07. Gooreh
08. Toberaki

References

Local-level governments of the Autonomous Region of Bougainville